Interleukin-2 receptor subunit beta is a protein that in humans is encoded by the IL2RB gene. Also known as CD122; IL15RB; P70-75.

Function 

The interleukin 2 receptor, which is involved in T cell-mediated immune responses, is present in 3 forms with respect to ability to bind interleukin 2. The low affinity form is a monomer of the alpha subunit (also called CD25) and is not involved in signal transduction. The intermediate affinity form consists of a gamma/beta subunit heterodimer, while the high affinity form consists of an alpha/beta/gamma subunit heterotrimer. Both the intermediate and high affinity forms of the receptor are involved in receptor-mediated endocytosis and transduction of mitogenic signals from interleukin 2. The protein encoded by this gene represents the beta subunit and is a type I membrane protein.

This protein also forms one of the three subunits of the IL-15 receptor.

Activation of the receptor increases proliferation of CD8+ effector T cells.

Interactions 

IL2RB has been shown to interact with:
 CISH, 
 HGS, 
 Janus kinase 1,  and
 SHC1.

See also 
 IL-2 receptor
 IL-15 receptor

References

Further reading